Bosanci, previously known as Bosancea, is a commune located in Suceava County, Bukovina, northeastern Romania. It is composed of two villages, namely Bosanci and Cumpărătura.

References 

Communes in Suceava County
Localities in Southern Bukovina